Roy Smith may refer to:

Sports
Roy Smith (boxer) (born 1961), British boxer
Roy Smith (cricketer, born 1930) (1930-2020), English cricketer
Roy Smith (cricketer, born 1910) (1910–1971), English cricketer
Roy Smith (racing driver) (1944–2004), former Canadian NASCAR driver
Roy Smith (1980s pitcher) (born 1961), American former Major League Baseball player
Roy Smith (2000s pitcher) (born 1976), American former Major League Baseball player
Roy Smith (footballer, born 1990), Costa Rican footballer
Roy Smith (footballer, born 1936), English footballer with Hereford United, West Ham United and Portsmouth
Roy Smith (Canadian football) (born 1920s), Canadian football player
Roy Smith (English footballer), see List of Wigan Athletic F.C. seasons
Roy Smith (basketball) in 1977–78 Golden State Warriors season
Roy Smith (motorcycle racer) in 1954 Grand Prix motorcycle racing season
Roy Smith (track athlete) in 2011 Pan American Junior Athletics Championships

Politicians
Roy Campbell Smith (1858–1940), Governor of Guam, 1916–1918
Roy Smith (Australian politician) (1953/4–2010), member of the Shooters Party

Others
Roy Allen Smith (born 1954), American animator, film director and producer
Roy Cornelius Smith, American operatic tenor
Roy Forge Smith, British production designer